The 1995 NCAA Division I Women's Lacrosse Championship was the 14th annual single-elimination tournament to determine the national champion of Division I NCAA women's college lacrosse. The championship game was played at Lions Stadium in Trenton, New Jersey during May 1995.  All NCAA Division I women's lacrosse programs were eligible for this championship; a total of 6 teams were invited to participate.

Maryland defeated Princeton, 13–5, to win their third national championship. This would subsequently be the first of Maryland's record seven straight national titles (1995–2001). Furthermore, Maryland's championship secured an undefeated season (17–0) for the team.

The leading scorer for the tournament, with 10 goals, was Cristi Samaras from Princeton. The Most Outstanding Player trophy was not awarded this year.

Teams

Tournament bracket

Tournament outstanding players 
Sarah Devens, Dartmouth
Lauren Holleran, Dartmouth
Kelly Amonte, Maryland
Jamie Brodsky, Maryland
Liz Downing, Maryland
Randall Goldsborough, Maryland
Laura Harmon, Maryland
Cathy Nelson, Maryland
Tami Riley, Maryland
Jill Pearsall, Penn State
Amory Rowe, Princeton
Cristi Samaras, Princeton

See also 
 NCAA Division I Women's Lacrosse Championship
 NCAA Division III Women's Lacrosse Championship
 1995 NCAA Division I Men's Lacrosse Championship

References

NCAA Division I Women's Lacrosse Championship
NCAA Division I Women's Lacrosse Championship
NCAA Women's Lacrosse Championship